Chinese Academy of Medical Sciences COVID-19 vaccine, or IMBCAMS COVID-19 vaccine, traded as Covidful, is a COVID-19 vaccine developed by .

Clinical trials
In May 2020, Covidful started phase I/II clinical trial with 942 participants in China.

In January 2021, Covidful started phase III clinical trials with 34,020 from Brazil and Malaysia.

Authorizations

On 9 June 2021, The vaccine has been approved by the Chinese authorities.

References

External links 

Clinical trials
Chinese COVID-19 vaccines
Inactivated vaccines